Robert Walpole (1676–1745) was the first prime minister of Great Britain.

Robert Walpole may also refer to:
Robert Walpole (colonel) (1650–1700), Member of Parliament for Castle Rising, 1689–1700
Robert Walpole, 2nd Earl of Orford (1701–1751), British peer, styled as The Lord Walpole from 1723 to 1745
Robert Walpole (diplomat) (1736–1810), clerk of the Privy Council and ambassador to Portugal
Robert Walpole (classical scholar) (1781–1856), English cleric and writer, son of the ambassador
Robert Walpole (cricketer) (1768–1834), English amateur cricketer
Robert Walpole (British Army officer) (1808–1876)
 (1913–1989), holder of Baron Walpole
Robert Walpole, 10th Baron Walpole (1938–2021), British politician

See also 
Walpole Vidal (Robert Walpole Sealy Vidal, 1853–1914), English footballer